Strikebound is a 1984 Australian film directed by Richard Lowenstein and based on the Wendy Lowenstein novel Dead Men Don't Dig Coal. The film got several AFI Award nominations and won in the Best Achievement in Production Design category.

Strikebound is the dramatised story of a coal-miners' strike in 1930s Australia, in the small south Gippsland town of Korumburra. The story is told through the struggles of Agnes and Wattie Doig, two Scottish immigrants, who were real people.

Cast
Chris Haywood as Wattie Doig
Carol Burns as Agnes Doig
Hugh Keays-Byrne as Idris Williams
Rob Steele as Charlie Nelson
Nik Forster as Harry Bell
David Kendall as Birch
Anthony Hawkins as Police Sergeant
Marion Edward as Meg

Production
Richard Lowenstein had made a short film Evictions about the unemployed during the Depression. He felt slightly unsatisfied by the experience and wanted to have another attempt at the subject matter. During the making of the short film he had mt Wattie and Agnes Doig and heard stories about unionism in coal mining in Victoria. He spent the next two years researching the story.

The film was originally envisioned as a 50-minute dramatised documentary called The Sunbeam Shaft but evolved into a feature film. The film was partly shot at a real disused mine in Wonthaggi, and Maldon, in Central Victoria.

Lowenstein was only 23 years old when he made the film.

Box office
Strikebound grossed $157,000 at the box office in Australia.

See also
Cinema of Australia

References

Further reading

External links

Strikebound at Australian Screen Online
Strikebound at Oz Movies

1984 films
Australian drama films
1984 drama films
1980s English-language films
Films directed by Richard Lowenstein
1980s Australian films